Ratshausen is a municipality the Zollernalbkreis district, in Baden-Württemberg, Germany.

History
In 1805, Ratshausen, previously a possession of the Austrian County of Hohenberg, was annexed by the Kingdom of Württemberg. The town transformed after World War II from a rural and agricultural town to a commercial center. Residential space was added to the southwest in the 1950s. Further development took place in the 1990s in the north and south.

Geography
The municipality (Gemeinde) of Ratshausen is located in the Zollernalb district of Baden-Württemberg, one of the 16 states of the Federal Republic of Germany. It is located at the southwest end of the district and borders Tuttlingen district to the south. Elevation above sea level in the municipal area ranges from a high of  Normalnull (NN) at the top of the Plettenberg to a low of  NN on the Schlichem.

A portion of the Federally-protected Ortenberg, and  nature reserves is located in Ratshausen's municipal area.

Coat of arms
Ratshausen's coat of arms depicts a white trowel upon a field of red. This pattern is derived from a seal used in the 19th century by the local Schultheiß that portrayed a oval shield with a wreath and a trowel upon it. The tool itself is a reference to the compulsory labor inhabitants of Ratshausen were expected to perform in the summer, usually the laying of bricks. The tincture, a reference to the County of Hohenberg, was decided by the provisional post-WWII Württemberg-Hohenzollern government that awarded this coat of arms to Ratshausen on 27 March 1950. A corresponding flag was issued by the Zollernalb district office on 21 May 1991.

Transportation

Notable people
 Michael Reitz, accused witch burned at the stake in 1580.
 Barbara Hengstallerin, accused witch burned at the stake in 1618.

References

External links
  (in German)

Württemberg